S. Nick King (born June 23, 1949) is an American politician. He is a former member of the Missouri House of Representatives, having served from 2015 to 2017. He is a member of the Republican party.

Electoral history

State Representative

References

Living people
Republican Party members of the Missouri House of Representatives
1949 births
21st-century American politicians